George Dryden Wheeler Jr. (31 August 1892 – 30 September 1957), known better as Wheeler Dryden, was an English actor and film director. He was the son of Hannah Chaplin and music hall entertainer Leo Dryden, and younger half-brother of actors Sir Charlie and Sydney Chaplin.

He moved to the United States in 1918, joining his mother and two half-brothers. He worked as an actor and director, sometimes assisting Charlie Chaplin. He was married for a time and was the father of Spencer Dryden, who became a rock musician with prominent American bands and was inducted into the Rock and Roll Hall of Fame.

Life and career
He was born as George Dryden Wheeler Jr. in London, the youngest of three boys born to Hannah Hill Chaplin, and the son of Leo Dryden, a music hall entertainer. While George was an infant, his father removed him from his mentally troubled mother, who was committed to a mental asylum for a time. He grew up estranged from her and his two older half-brothers. Known as Wheeler, Dryden became an entertainer like his father. In 1915 he was touring India and the Far East as a Vaudeville comedian when his father first told him that the newly famous actor Charlie Chaplin was his half-brother.

At this point, Dryden (who adopted use of this as his surname) wrote several letters to Chaplin and his half-brother Sydney, but received no response from either of them. In 1917, he got in touch with Chaplin's lead actress, Edna Purviance, who is thought to have convinced Chaplin to recognise Dryden as his half-brother.

He joined the Chaplin brothers and their mother in America in 1918. After nearly two decades, he became a naturalized U.S. citizen in 1936.

Dryden entered the growing film world as an actor, and later worked as a director. He appeared in Stan Laurel's Mud and Sand and was the "other man" in the melodrama, False Women. In 1928, he directed Syd Chaplin in A Little Bit of Fluff. He also played Plimsoll in the 1928 – 1929 Broadway theatre play, Wings Over Europe.

Later, he worked at the Chaplin Studios as Charlie's assistant director on The Great Dictator and Monsieur Verdoux. He also appears in the supporting roles of a doctor and a clown in Chaplin's last American film, Limelight (1952).

After Charlie Chaplin left America for Switzerland in 1952, Dryden managed the winding down of Chaplin's Hollywood business affairs until 1954, when the studio was sold. In his final years, he suffered from mental illness and reclusiveness. His difficulties were exacerbated by aggressive FBI inquiries into his brother's politics, during the period of increasing anti-Communist actions by government and Hollywood studios in the US.

Dryden died in Los Angeles in 1957.

Family
In 1938 Dryden married Alice Chapple (1911–2005), a prima ballerina of the Radio City Music Hall dancers. They had a son Spencer Dryden before they divorced in 1943. Dryden took his son to Los Angeles jazz clubs during the 1950s, which inspired his musical ambitions as a jazz and rock drummer. Spencer became a musician and played with Jefferson Airplane, New Riders of the Purple Sage, and other bands; he was inducted into the Rock and Roll Hall of Fame in 1996.

Selected filmography

References

External links

1892 births
1957 deaths
English male film actors
American male film actors
English film directors
American film directors
People from Brixton
Chaplin family
Male actors from London
20th-century English male actors
20th-century American male actors
Naturalized citizens of the United States
English people of Irish descent
American people of English descent
American people of Irish descent
British emigrants to the United States